

History

The society was established on the auspicious day of Lokmanya Tilak Jayanti on July 23, 1927. The society commenced educational activities in the same year by starting New English School, with a student strength of about 20 students on its roll. The society has not looked back since then. The sapling has flourished into a sprawling Banyan tree having multiple branches like Jubilee English School, Murtizapur High School, Jubilee and New English Junior College, M.C.V.C., Akola Law College, etc. At present, the society has several educational institutions under its patronage.

These institutions are providing educational services to nearly 5000 students at Akola and Murtizapur. The range of their activities spreads from K.G. to junior colleges. The vision of the management is to provide educational services to the student-community of the region ranging from K.G. to P.G. 
The society celebrated its platinum jubilee in 2002. As a mark of celebration and to commemorate the occasion, it was resolved to venture into the field of higher education by setting up a five-year degree course Law College at Akola. As a result, Akola Law College came into being and gives the opportunities of scholarships and Jobs. The college is recognized by the government of Maharashtra and affiliated to Amravati University. The Bar Council of India, New Delhi has accorded its approval to the college.

On 1 January 1932, the panel of life members was formed. The life members were Shri. S. J. Kulkarni, Shri. K.L. Khambalkar and Shri. D.H. Mandawgane.

Famous alumni
It is most notable institution since it has a number of alumni, who are currently engaged on high-ranking posts in India and abroad. Some of them are as follows:
 Justice Vallabhdasji Mohta
 Anand Modak, Great Indian musician

References

Educational institutions established in 1927
Education in Akola
Educational organisations in Maharashtra
1927 establishments in India